Seer 2 (Chinese: 赛尔号大电影2之雷伊与迈尔斯) is a 2012 Chinese animated fantasy adventure film based on an online game. The film is part of a film series, being preceded by Seer (2011) and followed by Seer the Movie 3: Heroes Alliance (2013). It was released on June 28, 2012.

Voice cast
Philip Lau
Jie Zhang
Zeng Yike

Reception

Box office
The film earned  at the Chinese box office.

References

2012 animated films
2012 films
Animated adventure films
Chinese animated fantasy films
Animated films based on video games
Chinese sequel films